Forestdale is a suburb of Logan City, Queensland, Australia.

Geography 
Forestdale is bounded to the west by the Brisbane-to-Sydney railway line and by Johnson Road to the north.

Oxley Creek flows through the suburb from the south-west (Greenbank) to the north (Heathwood/Larapinta).

Forestdale is named as such due to the lack of tree clearance compared to surrounding suburbs, although the risk of bushfire is greater than its neighbouring suburbs. "Forest" is from the modern day English word meaning a dense growth of trees and "dale" is originated from Middle English meaning a man who lived in the valley. The suffix is a reference to Robin Hood, an archer according to medieval folk tales. Many of the streets in the suburb are named after characters from Robin Hood stories.

Apart from substantial areas of reserve land, some market gardening, retail and minor pockets of farmland destined for development, Forestdale is residential in nature. Most houses are large and sit on extensive blocks of land.

History
Forestdale is a subdivision of and previously part of Browns Plains. 

The median age of the Forestdale population was 39 years, 2 years above the national median of 37.  71.4% of people living in Forestdale were born in Australia. The other top responses for country of birth were England 6.3%, New Zealand 3.5%, Taiwan 1.9%, Vietnam 1.4%, South Africa 1.2%.  81.7% of people spoke only English at home; the next most common languages were 2.7% Mandarin, 2.3% Vietnamese, 1.4% Spanish, 1% Cantonese, 1% Greek.

Education 
There are no schools in Forestdale. The nearest primary schools are in neighbouring Boronia Heights and nearby Regents Park and Browns Plains. The nearest secondary schools are Forest Lake State High School (in Forest Lake), Stretton State College (in Stretton), Browns Plains State High School (in Browns Plains) and Park Ridge State High School (in Park Ridge).

Greenwood Lakes 
The Greenwood Lakes wetland with high conservation values is found in Forestdale.  Visitors to the park may undertake bushwalking, walk the dog, bird watching and use the picnic tables, boardwalk and viewing platform provided.  A large lakes and terraced banks along Oxley Creek were created by commercial sand extraction operations in the area.

References

External links 

 
 Forestdale on the Web

Suburbs of Logan City